Jdeidat Artouz (also spelled Jdeidet Artouz) is a town in southern Syria, administratively part of the Rif Dimashq Governorate, located southwest of Damascus. Nearby localities include Qatana to the west, Artouz to the south, Khan al-Shih to the southeast, and Darayya to the northeast. According to the Syria Central Bureau of Statistics, Jdeidat Artouz had a population of 45,000 in the 2004 census. It has a mixed population of Christians, Druze, and Sunni Muslims. Christians and Druze primarily live in the southern district of Jdeidat Artouz al-Balad, while Sunnis primarily live in the northern district of Jdeidat al-Wadl.

Climate
In Jdeidat Artouz, there is a local steppe climate. Rainfall is higher in winter than in summer. The Köppen-Geiger climate classification is BSk. About  of precipitation falls annually.
The driest month is June, with 0 mm of rain. In January, the precipitation reaches its peak, with an average of 56 mm.
August is the warmest month of the year. The temperature in August averages 26.0 °C. At 7.0 °C on average, January is the coldest month of the year.

References

Populated places in Qatana District
Towns in Syria